First Presbyterian Church is a historic Presbyterian church located in the Fisher Park Historic District of Greensboro, North Carolina.

History 
First Presbyterian Church was founded in 1824 and was the first chartered Presbyterian church in the city. Four of its 12 original members were slaves. Thirty to 40 slaves were members by the time of the American Civil War, and after being freed, 37 former slaves started Saint James Presbyterian at Friendly Avenue and Church Street. Saint James is now located on Ross Avenue. First Presbyterian Church has occupied four buildings in its history. The first three were located at Church Street and Summit Avenue north of the city center. The third building on that site, a Romanesque Revival style brick structure, now houses the Greensboro Historical Museum. In 1929 First Presbyterian Church moved into its fourth and current building, a Gothic Revival cathedral overlooking Fisher Park.

Recent pastors 
 Dr. John A. Redhead began a 25-year pastorate in 1945. Dr. Redhead also spoke on the Protestant Radio Hour and Armed Forces Radio.
 Dr. Joseph B. Mullin served from 1971 to 1988. The church's Mullin Life Center is named in honor of Dr. Mullin. 
 Dr. Jerold D. Shetler served from 1988 to 1998. 
 On January 1, 2001, Dr. Sid Batts became the church's eleventh pastor.
 In 2018, Dr. Daniel W. Massie became interim pastor.

Notable parishioners 
 Janet Kay Ruthven Hagan, U.S. Senator from 2009 to 2015
 Thomas W. Ross, president of the University of North Carolina system from 2011 to 2016
 Mary Bonneau McElveen-Hunter, businesswoman and socialite, former U.S. Ambassador to Finland

 John Motley Morehead, 29th Governor of North Carolina
 William Cunningham Smith, Former Dean of the College of Liberal Arts at the University of North Carolina at Greensboro
 Robert Paine Dick, United States District Court Justice
 William Crosby Dawson, U.S. Congressman
 John Adams Gilmer, U.S. Congressman
 Pat McCrory, 74th Governor of North Carolina 
 L. Richardson Preyer, U.S. Congressman

References 

Churches in Greensboro, North Carolina
Gothic Revival church buildings in North Carolina
Presbyterian churches in North Carolina
Religious organizations established in 1824